Open wagons (trucks in the UK) form a large group of railway goods wagons designed primarily for the transportation of bulk goods that are not moisture-retentive and can usually be tipped, dumped or shovelled. The International Union of Railways (UIC) distinguishes between ordinary wagons (Class E/UIC-type 5) and special wagons (F/6). Open wagons often form a significant part of a railway company's goods wagon fleet; for example, forming just under 40% of the Deutsche Bahn's total goods wagon stock in Germany.

UIC standard goods wagons
Since the 1960s, the majority of goods wagons procured by European railway administrations have been built to standards laid down by, or based on, those established by the UIC. In addition to open wagons the table also shows wagons with opening roofs (Class T), whose design is based on open wagons.

Class E – Ordinary open high-sided wagons

These wagons have a level floor and solid sides with at least one door on each side. They are mainly used for transporting bulk goods, coal, scrap, steel, wood and paper. The majority of wagons have folding sides and end walls, otherwise they are given the letters l (fixed sides) or o (fixed end walls). Wagons may have one or two folding end walls. 
Steel rings enable ropes, nets or covers to be attached to secure the load.

Some of these wagons can also be completely tipped over, in other words, at certain places they can be lifted up and emptied by being turned about their longitudinal axis. This requires a very robust underframe. Sometimes the wagons are fitted with rotatable couplings so that they do not have to be individually uncoupled.

In 1998, the Deutsche Bahn (DB) had about 16,000 four-axle Class E wagons. They have increasingly retired their twin-axled E wagons since the 1990s and they are now rarely seen.

Class F – Special open high-sided wagons
The majority of these are self-discharging wagons which use gravity-unloading (hopper cars and saddle-bottomed wagons), but in addition there are also:
 Side-tipping wagons (box tip, trough-tip or side-tip wagon),
 Bucket wagon, other open wagons without side doors

In 1998, the Deutsche Bahn had about 12,000 hopper wagons, 10,000 saddle-bottomed wagons and 1,000 side-tipping wagons. In addition to hopper and saddle-bottomed wagons there were also wagons with opening roofs.

Typical loads for these wagons are all sorts of bulk goods, like coal, coke, ore, sand or gravel. Because bulk goods are often moved in large quantities, these wagons are frequently used in so-called unit or block trains that only comprise one type of wagon and only shift one type of product from the dispatcher to the recipient.

Hopper wagons

Hopper wagons can only be unloaded by gravity with no external assistance and are therefore also classed as self-discharging wagons. The majority may be filled, when at rail or road level, by high-level discharge chutes (whose ends are more than 70 cm above the top of the rails) or conveyor belts. Because a controlled amount of the load can be discharged at any place the wagons may be sent anywhere and are even used individually. Railway companies also use hoppers as departmental wagons in maintenance of way trains for ballasting the track.

Since the 1990s there has been a trend for new hopper wagons to be built as bogie wagons which have not yet been standardised by the UIC.

Gallery

Saddle-bottomed wagons

Saddle-bottomed wagons are large-volume hoppers are exclusively unloaded by gravity and are therefore classed as self-discharging hoppers. Unlike normal hopper wagons, however, their discharge cannot be controlled and the entire load must be dropped. To unload the flaps on the side swing out allowing the load to empty. This is aided by the floor which slopes downwards on both sides like a gable roof. The discharging chutes on either side are relatively high up. These wagons are frequently seen in unit trains for transporting bulk goods such as coal or mineral ore from mines or ports to steelworks or power stations.

It was built from 1992 in several batches. By February 2008 another 100 of these wagons were to have been delivered to the DB and another 300 by 2010.

Side-tipping wagons
Side-tipping wagons have hydraulic, pneumatic or electric tipping equipment, that enables the wagon body to be lifted on one side. Depending on the design, they may be tipped to both sides or just one side only. In order to prevent wagons from falling over during the tipping operation, some are equipped with track pinch bars with which they can be securely anchored to the trackbed. These wagons are often seen in unit trains being used to remove excavated material from major construction sites.

Specialized wagons

Lorry or mine car

A lorry or mine car is an open railroad car (gondola) with a tipping trough, used in mining.  It is known in the UK as a tippler or chaldron wagon, and in the US as a mine car.

Chaldrons

The first railway bulk-cargo gondolas, the first freight wagons, were the chaldron cars of the early coal-carrying plateways.  These were relatively short in length and tall in proportion, with a tapered body that widened upwards, above the wheels.  Once locomotive haulage began, the unstable and top-heavy nature of this design became a problem with increasing speeds and later wagons became lower and longer.  The chaldron shape survived in a few cases, such as low-speed working around a large factory sites including steelworks.

Modalohr road trailer carriers

Modalohrs are specialized wagons for carrying road trailers and road tractors on the AFF route from France to Italy and Luxembourg to Spain and vice versa; there are plans to expand this service. A deck between the bogies (trucks) pivots (swings) 30°, allowing the trailers to be loaded from the sides. The cars are built by Lohr Industrie.

Intermodal open wagons

See also

 Austauschbauart
 Class U special wagon
 German state railway norms
 Kriegsbauart
 Lowmac
 Quarry tub
 Slate waggon
 Verbandsbauart

References

External links
 Class Ua side-tippers in the Czech archives at parostroj.net
 DB goods wagon catalogue
 Flexiwaggon

Freight rolling stock
International Union of Railways